RPA-interacting protein is a protein that in humans is encoded by the RPAIN gene.

References

Further reading